Tennis was contested at the 2019 Summer Universiade from 5 to 13 July at the Circolo Tennis and Lungomare in Naples, Italy.

Participating nations
A total of 138 athletes from 44 nations competed in tennis at the 2019 Summer Universiade:

Medal summary

Medal table

Events

See also
 Tennis at the Summer Universiade

References

External links
2019 Summer Universiade – Tennis
Results book (Archived version)

 
Universiade
2019 Summer Universiade events
2019
2019